Mikloš is a surname. Notable people with the surname include:

 Andrej Mikloš (1924–2002), Slovak economist and cultural activist
 Ivan Mikloš (born 1960), Slovak politician
 Karol Mikloš (born 1972), Slovak musician

See also
 Miklós

Slovak-language surnames